Hiziel Souza Soares (born 16 May 1985 in Manaus, Amazonas), commonly known as Soares, is a Brazilian football striker for Atlético Catarinense.

Honours
Figueirense
Santa Catarina State League: 2006

Fluminense
Brazilian Cup: 2007

External links
 Guardian Stats Centre
 zerozero.pt
 globoesporte
 Fluminense contrata Soares e reedita dupla do Figueirense

1985 births
Living people
Brazilian footballers
Brazilian expatriate footballers
Campeonato Brasileiro Série A players
Campeonato Brasileiro Série B players
Campeonato Brasileiro Série C players
Hiziel Souza Soares
Londrina Esporte Clube players
Figueirense FC players
Fluminense FC players
Grêmio Foot-Ball Porto Alegrense players
Cruzeiro Esporte Clube players
Esporte Clube Vitória players
Associação Atlética Ponte Preta players
Associação Chapecoense de Futebol players
Vila Nova Futebol Clube players
América Futebol Clube (RN) players
Botafogo Futebol Clube (PB) players
Clube Náutico Marcílio Dias players
Villa Nova Atlético Clube players
River Atlético Clube players
Madureira Esporte Clube players
Hiziel Souza Soares
Hiziel Souza Soares
Lagarto Futebol Clube players
Esporte Clube Mamoré players
Association football forwards
Brazilian expatriate sportspeople in Thailand
Expatriate footballers in Thailand
People from Manaus
Sportspeople from Amazonas (Brazilian state)